Shipton-on-Cherwell and Thrupp is a civil parish in Oxfordshire, England. It was formed in 1955 by removing the hamlet of Thrupp from the parish of Kidlington and merging it with the parish of Shipton-on-Cherwell. It covers 6.04 km² and as at the 2011 census had 493 residents.

Sources

References

Civil parishes in Oxfordshire